Swingfire was a British wire-guided anti-tank missile developed in the 1960s and produced from 1966 until 1993. The name refers to its ability to make a rapid turn of up to ninety degrees after firing to bring it onto the line of the sighting mechanism. This means that the launcher vehicle could be concealed and the operator, using a portable sight, placed at a distance in a more advantageous firing position.

Swingfire entered operational service in 1969 and underwent several major upgrades during its time in service. It was used on a number of vehicles including the FV438, FV102 and several truck mountings including the Land Rover. Concepts adapting it to helicopters, tanks and even hovercraft went nowhere. Swingfire remained in service on the FV102 Striker until 2005 when they were retired in favour of man-portable missiles.

Development

Earlier efforts
The British Army was among the first to introduce a heavy anti-tank missile when they introduced the Malkara in 1958. The Malkara had a number of problems, among them that the missiles had to be raised into the line of sight for firing, and the missile left a line of smoke from its rocket motor that lingered long enough to point directly back to the launcher. Additionally, the guidance system was difficult to use and had limited performance against moving targets. Malkara was nevertheless purchased for the airborne infantry to allow them to deal with Soviet armour at long range.

Desiring a more capable weapon, the Ministry of Supply funded the Orange William development at Fairey Engineering Ltd beginning in 1954. Unfortunately, testing demonstrated the selected guidance system was easily blocked by smoke and dust, making it ineffective on the battlefield. With the Chieftain tank appearing to be able to defeat any Soviet design the need for a heavyweight weapon was less pressing and development was cancelled in September 1959.

Through the same period, a much lighter man-portable weapon was also being developed, the Vickers Vigilant. Based on the experience with Malkara, Vigilant introduced a much improved guidance system. While it was still manual, requiring the gunner to watch the missile approach the target, it used a new method of sending corrections to the missile that was far easier for the gunner to use, especially against moving targets. Vigilant went on to see widespread use in several nations including the United States.

Swingfire and TOW
The basic idea of under-cover fire remained of interest, and the Royal Armament Research and Development Establishment (RARDE) was given £250,000 a year to continue research into the basic concepts. As part of the resulting Project 12, they developed two basic concepts, Quickfire and Swingfire. The former appears to be a fast-action weapon, but few details have been made public. The latter was designed to allow it to be fired from under cover, like Orange William. As the company already had experience in the indirect fire role, and fearing it would otherwise lead to the breakup of their missile team, Fairey was issued a new development contract in October 1959.

The basic idea of the Swingfire concept was that thrust vectoring of the rocket exhaust allowed the missile to make extreme maneuvers, including a right-angle turn immediately after launch. The missiles could be fired without the launcher ever exposing itself to the enemy, and the gunner could easily remain hidden in a foxhole or building. While the rocket smoke would still give away the rough location of the launcher, the enemy would be unable to return fire.

As the Warsaw Pact greatly increased its number of tanks during the 1960s, the long-range missile was once again considered important. The Soviet plan was to simply overrun NATO forces using sheer numbers, so a weapon that could attrit these forces before they reached friendly forces was highly desirable. The US Army was equally interested in such a system, and in July 1961 the two countries signed the Rubel-Zuckerman Agreement for further development. Under this plan, the US would concentrate on short-range rapid-fire weapons, while RARDE would continue Swingfire development for the long-range role. Of the several concepts studied in the US, the BGM-71 TOW was ultimately selected. TOW used a semi-automatic guidance system that was very easy to use and capable of easily tracking moving targets, but had limited accuracy in long-range use and had to fly directly at the target and thereby expose the gunner to attack.

As TOW developed, it continued to grow larger and gain more range, ultimately emerging as a much larger design similar to the Swingfire. The US suggested the British adopt the TOW, but the necessity for the tracker to be inline with the missile throughout its flight was considered completely unacceptable to the British while the US saw this as irrelevant. Any plans to introduce TOW in British service ended.

FV438 Swingfire

Initially, some consideration was given to adding four Swingfire missiles to the Chieftain. Their external mounting was a significant problem, and fitting them required changes to the sighting systems, none of which was inexpensive. As the Royal Ordnance L11 main gun underwent development it proved far more powerful than expected and the extra hitting power of the Swingfire was no longer seen as a benefit worth the cost.

In November 1962, GOR.1174 was issued for a light vehicle to carry Swingfire instead, selecting the FV432 as its basis. The original design called for a roof-mounted rack with two launcher tubes angled upward at about 30 degrees. This allowed the vehicle to be placed behind barriers or inside entrenchments and the missile would pop up above it to clear the barrier. Aiming was accomplished either by the remote sight or one permanently mounted on an extension on top of the vehicle that also cleared any fortifications in front. The launchers were mounted on a hinge at the rear that allowed them to be lowered for reloading. It swung through an angle of 45 degrees so the front was pointed slightly downward when lowered to allow the loader easy access to the front of the tubes. On firing, the rocket exhaust was directed forward through the tube, thereby eliminating any danger to troops near the vehicle.

The rocket blast proved so powerful that it sometimes damaged the control wires or the missile itself. In one test, a simulated hangfire caused a fire that continued burning for three minutes and was believed it would have burned through the launcher and into the vehicle had it not been put out by a fire crew. The forward-exhaust concept was abandoned and a new launcher with open ports at the end of each tube was adopted. On launch, the exhaust hit the rear section of the vehicle deck and was deflected and spread out to a degree. Another change was that the two tubes were now separately mounted, instead of sharing a common hinge, which allowed one to be lowered for reload while the other was still in firing position.

Prototype problems
During testing, the system proved to have a huge number of minor problems and continually failed. It was not until 1969 that the system was considered even partially usable and the missiles began to work reliably.

A significant problem was due to the rocket smoke. In the original design, the concern had been that the smoke of previous weapon designs left a pointer directly back to the launcher which could then be attacked. Swingfire didn't need to be concerned about the smoke because the launcher itself would be hidden. However, in testing, it was found that the smoke was thick enough to obscure the missile or the target. This was especially a problem at long range when the missile was being viewed through the entire column of smoke. This made aiming at long range largely a matter of luck, and as a result the accuracy proved to be below specifications.

The missile was initially presented to the Army for acceptance in July 1969. and on 28 July they initially rejected it until additional corrections were made. They also found the training systems were inadequate. The new owners of the system, British Aerospace, agreed to make several changes to the design, and the Army eventually accepted  the design on a provision basis in August.

FV102 Striker

In 1960, the Army launched the Armored Vehicle Reconnaissance (AVR) program for a light tracked reconnaissance vehicle. The initial concept called for a single turret mounting both a gun and missiles, presumably Swingfire. However, attempts to design such a turret for a vehicle light enough for the requirements proved impossible and the project was cancelled in 1964.

In its place, an even lighter aluminium armoured vehicle was designed, the Combat Vehicle Reconnaissance (Tracked), or CVR(T). This differed from AVR primarily in abandoning the single turret concept and using mission-specific turrets on different vehicles. The most widely produced version was the FV101 Scorpion which mounted the 76 mm L23A1 gun firing HESH rounds capable of destroying most armoured vehicles, but not main battle tanks.

For this role, the FV102 Striker was designed, initially with a rotating turret mounting two Swingfire missiles on either side of the optics in the centre. However, this concept was seen as flawed as there was no need to rotate Swingfire to point at the target, so a new version was designed with five launcher tubes in a box along the rear of the vehicle. Another five rounds are stored in the vehicle, and like FV438, the tubes can be reloaded by lowering the tubes but the rounds have to be inserted from outside the vehicle.

Upgrades
The problem with the rocket exhaust became evident during the period in which new low-smoke solid rocket motors were being developed in the US and Canada, and the company agreed to develop a new motor for Swingfire to be available for 1972. Another lingering problem was that the gyro which kept the missile flying level tended to drift, but this was corrected simply by angling the launch tubes up more.

A larger upgrade was the "Swingfire Improved Guidance", or SWIG. This added an infrared tracker to the vehicle optics that tracked the rocket motor exhaust and sent the correct commands to the missile to bring it inline with the sights. This was the same basic system used on the TOW. This makes missile guidance much easier as the gunner simply has to keep their sight pointed at the target and does not have to make any corrections themselves.

Barr & Stroud introduced an infrared spotting scope that was evaluated by the Army in 1982. This led to a 1984 purchase of 3,500 sights. British Aerospace later introduced a thermal imaging sight that gave the missile much better night time performance.

Swingfire was developed by Fairey Engineering Ltd and the British Aircraft Corporation, together with Wallop Industries Ltd and minor subcontractors. It replaced the Vickers Vigilant missile in British service.

Besides its use on the FV438 Swingfire and the Striker armoured vehicles, Swingfire was developed to be launched from other platforms:
 FV712, Mk 5 Ferret with 4 missiles in use with the British Army
 Beeswing – pallet that can be mounted on on a Land Rover or similar.
 Hawkswing – on a Lynx helicopter.
 Golfswing – on a small trolley or Argocat vehicle.

Combat history
Swingfire was used in the Gulf War.

Replacement in British Army
After a lengthy debate, the Swingfire was replaced with the Javelin in mid-2005 to meet new and changing situational requirements. The British Army invested heavily in the Javelin, and it is now the main heavy anti-tank missile system in use by the British Army.

Specification
 Diameter: 170 mm
 Wingspan: 0.39 m
 Length: 1.07 m
 Weight: 27 kg
 Warhead: 7 kg HEAT
 Range: 150 m to 4000 m
 Velocity: 185 m/s  
 Guidance: Wire-guided, originally MCLOS, later upgraded to SACLOS, in which form the system is known as SWIG (Swingfire With Improved Guidance).
 Steering: Thrust Vectored Control (TVC)
 Penetration: 800 mm RHA
 Unit cost: £7,500

Operators

Current operators
: Egyptian Army
Swingfire missiles were also produced in Egypt under license by Arab-British Dynamics.

: Kenyan Army
: Nigerian Army

: Saudi Arabian Army
: SPAF

Former operators
: Belgian Army
FV102 Striker
: Iranian Army
: Portuguese Army
 Used on the Chaimite armoured fighting vehicle, now retired.
: British Army
 FV102 Striker – 5 in ready-to-fire bins.
 FV438 Swingfire – Two firing bins
 Ferret Mk 5 – Four firing bins

Decommissioning problems
In March 2002 when 20 warheads, removed for decommissioning, were washed into the Bristol Channel along with 8 anti-tank mines. The warheads, with a total explosive weight equivalent to 64.2 kg of TNT, were never located.

See also
CVR(T)

Notes

References

Citations

Bibliography

External links

 RAF Museum
 Global Defence
 Astronautix
 Skomer
 RAF Museum
 Live firing photo gallery, Strikers on German ranges, 1979
 Swingfire video

Anti-tank guided missiles of the United Kingdom
Anti-tank guided missiles of the Cold War
Vehicle weapons
British Aircraft Corporation
Military equipment introduced in the 1960s